Sodepur or Sodpur is a locality in Panihati Municipality of North 24 Parganas district in the Indian state of West Bengal. It is close to Kolkata and also a part of the area covered by Kolkata Metropolitan Development Authority (KMDA). Barrackpore, Kamarhati, Dumdum, Agarpara, and Belghoria are all close by. It is a centre for rising residential construction. GM Meena Icon, Peerless Nagar, Merlin Maximus, Godrej Prakriti, and NPR Gitanjali Apartments are a few notable residential developments in the neighbourhood.

History 
There was once a community named Sayyid in this area from which the place was known as Sayyidpur or Sodepur. The Khadi Pratishthan (Ashram) of Sodepur (or Khadi Ashram Sodepur) has witnessed many events in the history of the country's independence movement. This Pratishthan was like Sabarmati near Sodepur station which Gandhiji himself called his 'second home'. The importance of this Khadi Pratishthan is immense as it has witnessed many histories in the making. Several important decisions were taken by the national leaders on this premises.

Geography

Location

96% of the population of Barrackpore subdivision (partly presented in the map alongside, all places marked on the map are linked in the full screen map) lives in urban areas. In 2011, it had a density of population of 10,967 per km2. The subdivision has 16 municipalities and 24 census towns.

For most of the cities/ towns information regarding density of population is available in the Infobox. Population data is not available for neighbourhoods. It is available for the entire Municipal area and thereafter ward-wise.

Police station
Ghola and Khardaha police station under Barrackpore Police Commissionerate has jurisdiction over Panihati and New Barrackpore Municipal areas.

There is a police outpost at Sodepur.Main police station - Khardah Police Station.

Kolkata Urban Agglomeration
The following Municipalities, Census Towns and other locations in Barrackpore subdivision were part of Kolkata Urban Agglomeration in the 2011 census: Kanchrapara (M), Jetia (CT), Halisahar (M), Balibhara (CT), Naihati (M), Bhatpara (M), Kaugachhi (CT), Garshyamnagar (CT), Garulia (M), Ichhapur Defence Estate (CT), North Barrackpur (M), Barrackpur Cantonment (CB), Barrackpore (M), Jafarpur (CT), Ruiya (CT), Titagarh (M), Khardaha (M), Bandipur (CT), Panihati (M), Muragachha (CT) New Barrackpore (M), Chandpur (CT), Talbandha (CT), Patulia (CT), Kamarhati (M), Baranagar (M), South Dumdum (M), North Dumdum (M), Dum Dum (M), Noapara (CT), Babanpur (CT), Teghari (CT), Nanna (OG), Chakla (OG), Srotribati (OG) and Panpur (OG).

Sodepur is a part of Panihati Municipality.

Transport

Rail
Sodepur is well connected through Sodepur railway station on the Sealdah-Ranaghat line by the Eastern Railway suburban network.

Commuters
Around a total of 32 lakh people from all around the city commute to Kolkata daily for work. In the Sealdah-Krishnanagar section there are 34 trains that carry commuters from 30 railway stations. In the Sealdah-Shantipur section 32 trains carry commuters from 29 stations.

Road
The B.T. Road which passes through the heart of the town provides ample road transport. The Sodepur-Barasat Road also starts from here. East and west parts of Sodepur are connected with a Rail Overbridge named Satish Dasgupta Setu (Sodepur Bridge), which was inaugurated in 1995.

Bus

Private Bus
 56 Howrah Station - Ruiya Purbapara
 78 Esplanade - Barrackpore Court
 78/1 Babughat - Rahara Bazar/Parthapur 
 81/1 Barasat - Rajchandrapur
 214 Babughat - Sajirhat
 214A Esplanade - Sodepur Girja
 DN43 Barasat Checkpost - Dakshineswar

WBTC Bus
CTC Bus
 C28 Barrackpore Court - Howrah Station
 C45 Ghola Muragacha - Howrah Station

CSTC Bus
 E32 Nilganj - Howrah Station
 S11 Nilganj - Esplanade
 S32 Barrackpore Court - Howrah Station
 S58 Barrackpore Court - Salt Lake Karunamoyee
 AC20 Barrackpore Court - Santragachi railway station (8 AM to 9 AM and afternoon 2 PM to 3 PM. In the Evening, the Bus plies from B.B.D. Bagh to Dunlop.)

Bus Routes Without Numbers
 Howrah Station - Madhyamgram 
 Sodepur Girja - Uluberia Court
 Barrackpore Court - Salap
 Barrackpore Court - Mourigram railway station
 Lalkuthi - Howrah Station

Education

The oldest school at Sodepur is Sodepur High School which is affiliated to West Bengal Board. It was established in 1853.

The other schools here are:
 Natagarh Sri Sri Ramkrishna Vidyamandir (Ramkrishnapur), affiliated to West Bengal Board (Bengali medium)
 Swami Vivekananda Seva Sumity Vidhyalaya (Buniyadi School), affiliated to West Bengal Board (Bengali medium)
 Chandrachur Vidyapith, for boys, girls and primary, affiliated to West Bengal Board (Bengali medium) 
 Sukchar Karmadaksha Chandrachur Vidyayatan, for boys, and primary, affiliated to West Bengal Board (Bengali medium)
 Sukchar Satadal balika vidyayatan, for girls, and primary, affiliated to West Bengal Board (Bengali medium)
 Desbandhu Sikshyatan, affiliated to West Bengal Board (Bengali medium)
 Sushil Chandra Balika Vidyalay, affiliated to West Bengal Board (Bengali medium)
 Central Point School affiliated to CISCE Board (English medium)
 Park Institution, affiliated to CISCE Board (English medium)
 National Model School, H.B. Town, affiliated to CISCE Board (English medium)
 St. Pauls, Amrabati, affiliated to CISCE Board (English medium)
 St. Xavier's Institution, affiliated to CISCE
SUSHIL KRISHNA SIKSHAYATAN School (Bengali medium)
Ramakrishna Vivekananda Mission Debarati Roy Memorial Institute (English Medium) West Bengal Board
Sodepur Nabodoy Institute affiliated to West Bengal Board (Bengali Medium)

In the area of higher education, there are many colleges:
 Panihati Mahavidyalaya, affiliated to West Bengal State University, government-aided 
 Guru Nanak Institute of Technology, private
 Guru Nanak Institute of Hotel Management, private
 Guru Nanak Institute of Dental Sciences and Research and Hospital, private
 Guru Nanak Institute of Pharmaceutical Science and Technology, private
 JIS University, private

Employment

The Skill Institute offers new approach to creating more employable youth in Bengal, by using a three-pronged approach of policy aggregation, skill development and job creation. It was started by London School of Economics and University College London alumni.

References

External links 

 Sodepur Bazar website

Cities and towns in North 24 Parganas district
Neighbourhoods in Kolkata
Kolkata Metropolitan Area
Neighbourhoods in North 24 Parganas district